Christian Albert "Xian" Soriano Gaza (born July 5, 1993) is a Filipino internet personality and businessman.

Career
Gaza claim to be the President and CEO of Hong Kong-based Guanxiqian Group. He also claims to be the founder of Gazaboy Group of Companies and Gazera Media. 

He first came to wider public attention in mid-2017 for publicly asking out actress Erich Gonzales for a coffee date via a billboard. 

Allegations of him being a scammer arose soon after involving his ventures. This includes his averted ventures with the Haiyan Shirt Project charity project for victims of Typhoon Haiyan (Yolanda) and Filipino Vines, a social media venture. This also includes his transaction with a buy-and-sell business of Ella Cruz's father where Gaza intended to buy a Fortuner.

Arrest and later exile
In April 2018, a warrant of arrest was issued against Gaza for allegedly violating the Bouncing Check Law. He got involved in a  investment scheme involving a coffee shop with Melinda Cruz and Jaime Asuncion.

Gaza admitted to scamming the couple and surrendered himself to the Malabon City police on April 12, 2018. He was released a day later after being able to secure funds for his bail.
In June 2018, he was sentenced to five years and six months of imprisonment for 11 counts of violation of the Bouncing Check Law

On September 30, 2018, Gaza took a flight abroad to Hong Kong to evade arrest. His account of his supposed escape by booking multiple flights was dismissed by the Bureau of Immigration as a hoax and considered filing a case against him for making a mockery of airport procedure though admitted that he was cleared to depart the country due to having no derogatory record left on Gaza at the time.

Xian Coin

In 2021, Gaza released his own cryptocurrency which he dubbed as the Xian Coin (XNC). The Securities and Exchange Commission (SEC) has issued an advisory in June 2021 against the venture. The SEC concludes that XNC indicates a Ponzi scheme. In December 2021, the SEC has filed a cease and desist order against the venture.

It is powered through the Ethereum blockchain and is traded exclusively by its holders. It is purportedly exchangeable to Colombian peso, Mexican peso, Brazilian real, Peruvian sol and Philippine peso. It is associated with the blockchain game Surreal Estate.

Personal life
Gaza is known for asking out various celebrities for a date. In 2017, Gaza asked actress Erich Gonzales for a coffee date through a billboard. Amused at first, Gonzales eventually rejected Gaza's advances after controversies about him arose. In 2020, he attempted to win Nadine Lustre's affection by sending her a red Ford Mustang sports car. In 2021, he rented a billboard in Seoul to put up an advertisement asking Blackpink member Jennie for a date. Fans of the K-pop artist were critical of the move.

References

1993 births
Filipino businesspeople
Filipino Internet celebrities
Confidence tricksters
Living people